Ashlyn Kohl Sanchez (born July 27, 1996) is a former American child actress. Notable roles include Crash and The Happening.

Filmography

Film

Television

Critical reception
Sanchez earned specific praise for her role in Crash: "Michael Pena and Ashlyn Sanchez flat out steal the movie with their sweet-yet-not-saccharine, wholly realistic father-daughter relationship. They share an incredibly touching scene that not only adds gravitas to their storyline, but also to the entire movie"; and criticism for her role in The Happening.

References

External links

NY Times profile of Sanchez
TV Guide profile of Sanchez

1996 births
American child actresses
American television actresses
American film actresses
Living people
21st-century American women
Actresses from California